Waleed Abdalati held the position of NASA Chief Scientist from 3 January 2011 through December 2012. Abdalati was named to this position on 13 December 2010 by NASA Administrator Charles Bolden.  Abdalati previously served NASA as Head of Cryospheric Sciences at Goddard Space Flight Center between January 2004 and June 2008.

Early life and education
Abdalati grew up in Hartford, New York and lost his father at age 12.

Abdalati earned a Bachelor of Science (cum laude) from Syracuse University Department of Mechanical and Aerospace Engineering in 1986, and later completed his graduate studies at the University of Colorado, where he received a M.Sc. in 1991 from the Department of Aerospace Engineering Sciences and a Ph.D. in 1996 from the Department of Geography. In his doctoral research, Abdalati developed an algorithm to use the ratio of two microwave bands of the Special Sensor Microwave/Imager (SSM/I) sensor aboard Defense Meteorological Satellite Program (DMSP) vehicles to remotely detect changes in the spatial extent of the Greenland ice sheet's annual melt.

Career
Abdalati is seconded to NASA from the University of Colorado at Boulder, where he is Director of the Earth Science and Observation Center at the Cooperative Institute for Research in Environmental Sciences and Associate Professor in the Department of Geography. He is the current director of the Cooperative Institute for Research in Environmental Sciences.

In November 2020, Abdalati was named a member of the Joe Biden presidential transition Agency Review Team to support transition efforts related to the National Aeronautics and Space Administration.

Honors and awards
 Fellow, American Association for the Advancement of Science (since 2019)
 NASA GSFC Center Director’s Team Recognition Award, 2007
 American Institute of Aeronautics and Astronaustics Space Systems Award, 2006
 National Aeronautics and Space Administration Exceptional Service Medal, 2004
 NASA Group Achievement Award, ICESat Science Team, 2004
 NASA Office of Earth Science Award, 2003
 NASA Group Achievement Award, Honor Award Team 2003
 NASA Office of Earth Science Terra Peer Award, 2002
 NASA Office of Earth Science Award, 2002
 NASA Office of Earth Science Award, 2001
 Presidential Early Career Award for Scientists and Engineers, 1999
 Tau Beta Pi National Engineering Honor Society (since 1985)

References

Living people
NASA people
Syracuse University College of Engineering and Computer Science alumni
University of Colorado faculty
Year of birth missing (living people)